In enzymology, a ganglioside galactosyltransferase is an enzyme that catalyzes the chemical reaction

UDP-galactose + N-acetyl-D-galactosaminyl-(N-acetylneuraminyl)-D-galactosyl-1,4-beta-D-glucosyl-N-acylsphingosine  UDP + D-galactosyl-1,3-beta-N-acetyl-D-galactosaminyl-(N-acetylneuraminyl)-D-galactosyl-D-glucosyl-N-acylsphingosine

The 2 substrates of this enzyme are UDP-galactose and N-acetyl-D-galactosaminyl-(N-acetylneuraminyl)-D-galactosyl-1,4-beta-D-glucosyl-N-acylsphingosine, whereas its 2 products are UDP and D-galactosyl-1,3-beta-N-acetyl-D-galactosaminyl-(N-acetylneuraminyl)-D-galactosyl-D-glucosyl-N-acylsphingosine.

This enzyme belongs to the family of glycosyltransferases, specifically the hexosyltransferases.  The systematic name of this enzyme class is UDP-galactose:N-acetyl-D-galactosaminyl-(N-acetylneuraminyl)-D-galac tosyl-D-glucosyl-N-acylsphingosine beta-1,3-D-galactosyltransferase. Other names in common use include UDP-galactose-ceramide galactosyltransferase, uridine diphosphogalactose-ceramide galactosyltransferase, UDP galactose-LAC Tet-ceramide alpha-galactosyltransferase, UDP-galactose-GM2 galactosyltransferase, uridine diphosphogalactose-GM2 galactosyltransferase, uridine diphosphate D-galactose:glycolipid galactosyltransferase, UDP-galactose:N-acetylgalactosaminyl-(N-acetylneuraminyl), galactosyl-glucosyl-ceramide galactosyltransferase, UDP-galactose-GM2 ganglioside galactosyltransferase, and GM1-synthase.  This enzyme participates in glycosphingolipid biosynthesis - ganglioseries and glycan structures - biosynthesis 2.

References

 
 
 

EC 2.4.1
Enzymes of unknown structure